Antoine Daniel (born April 23, 1989) is a French video game livestreamer, vlogger and actor. He is known for his famous humoristic program What The Cut !?, published between 2012 and 2017 on YouTube. He has become extremely successful, reaching more than 2.8 million subscribers in August 2018. He is on Twitch since 2018 and has more than 700 000 followers in December 2021.

Biography 
He studied for two years at the ESRA in Paris before beginning his training in sound engineering while devoting himself to musical composition. Once he acquired his BTS, he was temporarily employed in a musical publishing house as an operator of input, an experience which he didn't enjoy. It was during that time, on 1 March 2012, that he created the show What The Cut !?.

Inspiration
Antoine Daniel qualifies the British filmmaker TomSka as one of his favourite video makers. He later played a role in his video Le Alien.

YouTube

What The Cut !?
What The Cut !? was a humoristic show created by Antoine Daniel, the first episode of "What The Cut !?" was uploaded on 1 March 2012 on his YouTube channel. The concept of the show comes from Ray William Johnson's Equals Three. When it comes to his humour and staging inspirations, his most obvious references are videographer TomSka and British director Edgar Wright.

In each episode of What The Cut !?, Antoine Daniel analyses three funny, strange or freaky videos, and jokingly comments on them. However, What The Cut !? Is not a French “Equals Three” as Antoine Daniel completely changed the concept. In What The Cut !? he plays a character who speaks very quickly, wildly and sometimes screams. The video editing is very quick, and the jokes are completely absurd which explains the show's name: "What the ...” for the absurd, wacky and crazy jokes and humour, and “Cut”, for the video editing, which Antoine Daniel considers the most important part of his videos.

After the first couple of videos, episodes were released monthly. However, that schedule couldn't be kept starting with episode #35 since later episode would featured a 5 to 15 minute sketch at the beginning of the video. The 37th and last episode was released on 30 December 2015.

Clyde Vanilla

Clyde Vanilla is a science fiction audio story. The first episode was released on 17 September 2017. The last and tenth episode was released on 19 November 2017.

However, this series wasn't as well received as What The Cut !?.' later What The Cut !?'' episodes would get.

Twitch 

Since 2018, Antoine is streaming on Twitch. As of August 2022, he has  followers.

He participated to 2019, 2020, 2021 and 2022 editions of Z Event, a French charity reuniting several francophone streamers.

References 

Twitch (service) streamers
French YouTubers
1989 births
Living people
GeoGuessr players